Hypselognathus horridus, known commonly as the prickly pipefish or shaggy pipefish is a species of marine fish belonging to the family Sygnathidae This species lives on the continental shelf in depths ranging from . It is endemic to the Great Australian Bight, located in South Australia. Reproduction occurs through ovoviviparity in which the males brood eggs and give birth to live young

References

External links
Hypselognathus horridus at Fishbase
Hypselognathus horridus at Fishes of Australia

Syngnathidae
Fish described in 1982